Khoshbakht Yusifzadeh Baghir oglu is an Azerbaijani academician and the First Vice-President of the State Oil Company of Azerbaijan Republic (SOCAR). He is Doctor of Science in Geology and Mineralogy.

Biography
Yusifzadeh was born in Pirshagi settlement of Baku on January 14, 1930, during the birthday party of his mother, for which his father named him Khoshbakht which means Happy in Azerbaijani. According to his father Baghir Yusifzade, Khoshbakht was the "first child in Pirshagi to have been born when the music played on".

Khoshbakht Yusifzadeh graduated from the Azerbaijani Institute of Industry (now: Azerbaijan State Oil and Industry University) in 1952. He started his career as a geologist and later worked as senior geologist in Neft Dashlary, an offshore city in the Caspian Sea. In 1970, he was appointed Assistant Manager as well as Senior Geologist at the offshore oil and gas production department. Since 1987, Yusifzadeh is Doctor of Science in Geology and Mineralogy, and in 1994, he was appointed Vice-president of SOCAR for Geology, Geophysics and Field Development. Yusifzadeh is known for having discovered numerous oil and gas fields such as Bahar, Gunashli, Azeri, Chirag, Kapaz, etc. He is also a member of Azerbaijan National Academy of Sciences.

Works and awards
Yusifzadeh is the author of more than 127 scientific works, as well as 8 monographs and 4 inventions. He was twice awarded with the Order of the Red Banner of Labour and the Order of Labour Glory as well as the State Prize (1982 and 1991), Sharaf Order (Order of Honor), Istiglal Order (Order of Sovereignty; January 13, 2000) and numerous medals and honorary decrees.

Yusifzadeh is the honorary geologist of the former USSR and the honored engineer of the Republic of Azerbaijan. He was awarded with the Honorary Explorationist of the Earth Crust.

Yusifzadeh is the member and the First Vice-President of the International Eastern Petroleum Academy. He is also the corresponding member of the Russian International Academy of Engineers. In January 2010, by the decree of the President of Azerbaijan, 80th anniversary of Yusifzade was held at a state level. He is the author of several books on geology and safety in petroleum industry. Yusifzade was awarded a title of Scientist of the Year in Turkey in 2009.

Yusifzadeh is married and has two children.

On the occasion of his 90th jubileum anniversary, he was awarded the supreme state order of Azerbaijan - Heydar Aliyev Order by the President Ilham Aliyev on January 13, 2020 for his exceptional contribution to and long-term effective activity in the development of oil industry of Azerbaijan.

References

Living people
1930 births
Scientists from Baku
Azerbaijani businesspeople in the oil industry
Recipients of the Order of Labour Glory
Recipients of the Istiglal Order
Azerbaijan State Oil and Industry University alumni
Businesspeople from Baku
Recipients of the Azerbaijan Democratic Republic 100th anniversary medal
Recipients of the Heydar Aliyev Order
Recipients of the Shohrat Order
Recipients of the Order of the Red Banner of Labour